Hiroki Yamamoto may refer to:
Hiroki Yamamoto (footballer), Japanese footballer
Hiroki Yamamoto (rugby union), Japanese rugby union player